40-kDa huntingtin-associated protein is a protein that in humans is encoded by the F8A1, F8A2, and F8A3 genes.

F8A1 is contained entirely within intron 22 of the factor VIII gene; spans less than 2 kb, and is transcribed in the direction opposite of factor VIII. A portion of intron 22 (int22h), containing F8A1, is repeated twice extragenically closer to the Xq telomere (genes F8A2, F8A3). Although its function is unknown, the observation that this gene is conserved in the mouse implies it has some function. Unlike factor VIII, this gene is transcribed abundantly in a wide variety of cell types.

References

Further reading